Quialigo is a locality in Goulburn Mulwaree Council in New South Wales, Australia. It lies about 25 km south of Goulburn on the road to Windellama and 110 km northeast of Canberra.

Quialigo had a state school from 1871 to 1877, 1902 to 1910 and 1917 to 1924. This was described at different times as a "half-time school" or a "provisional school".

References

Goulburn Mulwaree Council
Localities in New South Wales
Southern Tablelands